Mathias Jucker (born 7 July 1961 in Zürich, Switzerland) is a Swiss neuroscientist, Professor, and a Director at the Hertie Institute for Clinical Brain Research of the University of Tübingen. He is also a group leader at the German Center for Neurodegenerative Diseases (German: Deutsches Zentrum für Neurodegenerative Erkrankungen, (DZNE)) in Tübingen. Jucker is known for his research on the basic biologic mechanisms underlying brain aging and Alzheimer’s disease.

Education and career 
Jucker received his doctoral degree (1988) in Natural Sciences from ETH Zürich, after which he began his research on aging in the brain at the National Institute on Aging (NIA) in Baltimore, United States, and then at the University of Basel (Switzerland). In 2003 he became Full Professor of Cell Biology of Neurological Diseases at the University of Tübingen. In 2009 he was named a group leader at the DZNE in Tübingen, and in 2012 he became the founding coordinator of the Dominantly Inherited Alzheimer’s Disease Network (DIAN) in Germany.

Research

Prion-like properties of disease-causing proteins 
Jucker’s research has focused on understanding how certain proteins cause disease by adopting abnormal 3-dimensional shapes (conformations) in the nervous system. In collaboration with Lary Walker, Jucker was the first to show in experimental mice that the accumulation of abnormally folded proteins in Alzheimer’s disease occurs by a prion-like mechanism. The prion concept has since been expanded to include several other proteins, including tau and α-synuclein, which similarly misfold and aggregate in a class of diseases known as proteopathies.

Biomarkers of Alzheimer’s disease 
Jucker also has contributed to the development and validation of biomarkers for Alzheimer’s disease and other neurodegenerative disorders. He found that changes in cerebrospinal fluid (CSF) biomarkers in mouse models closely resemble the changes in humans with Alzheimer’s disease, and he and his colleagues showed that a protein in neurons known as neurofilament light chain can serve as a biomarker in the blood and cerebrospinal fluid that can be used to determine the progression of Alzheimer’s Disease.

Awards 
Jucker has received the Research Prize of the Swiss Alzheimer Association (2001), the Zenith Fellows Award of the Alzheimer's Association (2006), the Soriano Lectureship of the American Neurological Association (2010), the Hamburg Science Award for dementia research from the Academy of Sciences and Humanities in Hamburg (2013), the Metlife Foundation Award for Medical Research in Alzheimer's Disease (2014), and the International Prize for Translational Neuroscience of the Gertrud Reemtsma Foundation (Max-Planck-Gesellschaft) (2020).

Bibliography

Selected research publications 
“Cerebral hemorrhage following anti-Aß-immunotherapy”. Pfeifer M, Boncristiano S, Bondolfi L, Stalder A, Deller T, Staufenbiel M, Mathews P, Jucker M (2002). Science 298: 1379. doi: 10.1126/science.1078259; .
“Aß is targeted to the vasculature in a mouse model of hereditary cerebral hemorrhage with amyloidosis”. Herzig MC, Winkler DT, Burgermeister P, Pfeifer M, Kohler E, Schmidt SD, Danner S, Abramowski D, Stürchler-Pierrat C, Bürki K, van Duinen SG, Maat-Schieman MLC, Staufenbiel M, Mathews PM, Jucker M (2004). Nature Neuroscience 7: 954-60. doi: 10.1038/nn1302; .
“Exogenous induction of Aβ-amyloidogenesis is governed by intrinsic properties of agent and host”. Meyer-Luehmann M, Coomaraswamy J, Bolmont T, Kaeser S, Schaefer C, Kilger E, Neuenschwander A, Abramowski D, Frey P, Jaton AL, Vigouret J, Paganetti P, Walsh DM, Mathews P, Ghiso J, Staufenbiel M, Walker L, Jucker M (2006). Science 313: 1781-1784. doi: 10.1126/science.1131864; .
“Formation and maintenance of Alzheimer’s disease β-amyloid plaques in the absence of microglia”. Grathwohl SA, Kälin RE, Bolmont T, Prokop S, Winkelmann G, Kaeser SA, Odenthal J, Radde R, Eldh T, Gandy S, Aguzzi A, Staufenbiel M, Mathews PM, Wolburg H, Heppner FL, Jucker M (2009). Nature Neuroscience 12: 1358-1360. doi: 10.1038/nn.2432; .
“Peripherally applied Aß-containing inoculates induce cerebral β-amyloidosis”. Eisele YS, Obermueller U, Heilbronner G, Baumann F, Kaeser SA, Wolburg H, Walker LC, Staufenbiel M, Heikenwalder M, Jucker M (2010). Science 330: 980-982. doi: 10.1126/science.1194516; .
“The benefits and limitations of animal models for translational research in neurodegenerative diseases”. Jucker M (2010) Nature Medicine 16: 1210-1214. doi: 10.1038/nm.2224; .
“The amyloid state of proteins in human diseases”. Eisenberg D, Jucker M (2012). Cell 148: 1188-1203. doi: 10.1016/j.cell.2012.02.022; .
“Changes in amyloid-β and Tau in the cerebrospinal fluid of transgenic mice overexpressing amyloid precursor protein”. Maia LF, Kaeser SA, Reichwald J, Hruscha M, Martus P, Staufenbiel M, Jucker M (2013). Science Translational Medicine 5, 194re2 (2013). doi: 10.1126/scitranslmed.3006446; .
“Self-propagation of pathogenic protein aggregates in neurodegenerative diseases”. Jucker M, Walker LC (2013). Nature 501: 45-51. doi: 10.1038/nature12481; .
“Persistence of Aß seeds in APP-null mouse brain”. Ye L, Fritschi SK, Schelle J, Obermüller U, Degenhardt K, Kaeser SA, Eisele YS, Walker LC, Baumann F, Staufenbiel M, Jucker M (2015). Nature Neuroscience 18: 1559-1561. doi: 10.1038/nn.4117; .
“Neurofilament light chain in blood and CSF as marker of disease progression in mouse models and in neurodegenerative diseases”. Bacioglu M, Maia LF, Preische O, Schelle J, Apel A, Kaeser SA, Schweighauser M, Eninger T, Lambert M, Pilotto A, Shimshek D, Neumann U, Kahle PJ, Staufenbiel M, Neumann M, Maetzler W, Kuhle J, Jucker M (2016). Neuron 91: 56-66. doi: 10.1016/j.neuron.2016.05.018; .
“Microglia turnover with aging and in an Alzheimer´s model via long-term in vivo single-cell imaging”. Füger P, Hefendehl JK, Veeraraghavalu K, Schlosser C, Wendeln A-C, Obermüller U, Wegenast-Braun BM, Neher JJ, Martus P, Kohsaka S, Thunemann M, Feil R, Sisodia SS, Skodras A, Jucker M (2017). Nature Neuroscience 20:1371-1376. doi: 10.1038/nn.4631; .
“Propagation and spread of pathogenic protein assemblies in neurodegenerative diseases”. Jucker M, Walker LC (2018). Nature Neuroscience 21: 1341-1349. doi: 10.1038/s41593-018-0238-6; .
“Serum neurofilament dynamics predicts neurodegeneration and clinical progression in presymptomatic Alzheimer´s disease”. Preische O, Schultz S, Apel A, Kuhle J, Kaeser SA, Barro C, Gräber S, Kuder-Buletta E, LaFougere C, Laske C, Vöglein J, Levin J, Masters CL, Martins R, Schofield PR, Rossor MN, Graff-Radford NR, Salloway S, Ghetti B, Ringman JM, Noble JM, Chhatwal J, Goate AM, Benzinger TLS, Morris JC, Bateman RJ, Wang G, Fagan AM, McDade EM, Gordon BA, Jucker M, Dominantly Inherited Alzheimer Network (2019). Nature Medicine 25: 277-283. doi: 10.1038/s41591-018-0304-3; .

Complete List of Published Work: https://scholar.google.com/scholar?hl=en&as_sdt=0%2C11&q=mathias+jucker&oq=mathias

Books 
Alzheimer: 100 Years and Beyond (2006); M. Jucker, K. Beyreuther, C. Haass, R.M. Nitsch, Y. Christen, Eds. 
Proteopathic Seeds and Neurodegenerative Diseases (2013); M. Jucker, Y. Christen, Eds.

References

External links
The red-hot debate about transmissible Alzheimer’s
Transmissible Alzheimer´s theory gains traction
Medizin: „Habe auch den Defekt“ (Article on the Dominantly Inherited Alzheimer Network in Germany)
Die Saat des Vergessens (Article on protein seeding in Alzheimer's disease)

Living people
ETH Zurich alumni
Medical researchers
Alzheimer's disease researchers
Academic staff of the University of Tübingen
1961 births